The Fiat S76, later also known as Fiat 300 HP Record and nicknamed "The Beast of Turin", was a car built in 1910 by the Italian company Fiat specifically to beat the land speed record held in those years by the Blitzen Benz. Its 28,353 cc displacement engine delivered 290 hp. Only two examples were built.

Technical Features

The radiator design of this "prototype" for records was reused by Fiat for subsequent road models.

History
The first S76 was constructed in 1910 and kept by Fiat. It was tested by Felice Nazzaro, who considered the  car ‘uncontrollable'. The second S76 was sold by Fiat to Russian Prince Boris Soukhanov, in 1911. Soukhanov originally hired Pietro Bordino to drive the car on the Brooklands motor racing circuit in Weybridge, Surrey, England. Bordino refused to drive the car faster than 90 mph. Soukhanov then hired American driver Arthur Duray in a December 1913 land speed record attempt at Ostende, Belgium. The Beast of Turin was granted an unofficial title of world's fastest car due to this speed, but not made official due to being unable to complete the run within the time limit.

Following the First World War, the first S76 built was dismantled by Fiat at the end of 1919. Soukhanov's S76, missing its engine, ended up in Australia, where it was rebuilt and re-powered with a Stutz engine. The S76's career ended when it was crashed at Armadale in the early 1920s while practicing for a race to the coast.
After the 2 engine car built from 1910 and 1911, FIAT built similar engines for airships, changing  to 3 valves (two exhaust and one intake) and 3 spark plugs (the car engine had 2 spark plugs) That engine built from 1912 and 1913 was mounted on Forlanini airships. The last one to survive from 6 built is in the Capetti collection of Politecnico di Torino.

Restoration 
Duncan Pittaway obtained an Edwardian Fiat chassis and had it shipped to the UK. After getting, under unclear circumstances, the surviving S76 engine from the sister car, Pittaway started the recreation of the S76. Three major parts of the car needed to be recreated from scratch, including the double chain-drive gearbox, the body and the radiator. All those parts were re-created by referencing original Fiat drawings, and period photographs. In November 2014, Pittaway and his team managed to return the S76 engine to working order: Leonardo Sordi, an Italian Air Force consultant and historic expert of mechanics and magnetos, built a full ignition system (including spark plugs), a full set of engine bearings (white metal shells) and rework the original crankcase n°2 for realignment of the bench supports, deformed over 100 years. The repair was completed in 2015 and the "Beast of Turin" was displayed and driven for the first time in almost a century at the 2015 Goodwood Festival of Speed on June 23-26.

It has since been displayed and competed at the Chateau Impney Hill Climb during 11–12 July 2015 and the Prescott Speed Hill Climb in May 2016.

In 2019 the Italian authorities started an investigation, as they have ascertained that the S76 engine mounted on the "Beast of Turin" was originally kept in the "Antonio Capetti Collection" of the Polytechnic of Turin: the power unit was loaned to Mr. Pittaway in charge of research and restoration, but the “Collection” discovered after some years that they had been returned with a non-functional replica block.

References
 What a 28.5-liter LSR engine sounds like firing up for the first time in 100 years - Chris Bruce, Autoblog, 02/12/2014
  - Dopo 100 anni risorge la Fiat S76 300 HP Record
 After a 100-year slumber, the Beast of Turin comes to life - Kurt Ernst, Hemmings, 12/04/2014
 The Monster is Stirring – The Rebirth of a 1729 Cubic Inch S.76 Fiat The Old Motor, 5/03/2014
 The Beast of Turin awakens: Fiat S76 driven for the first time in a century -- and it's very, very angry Graham Kozak, Autoweek, 15 March 2015
 The Beast Of Turin Captivates Crowds at 2015's Chateau Impney Hill Climb 24 March 2016
 RE: Fiat S76 (merged) Duncan Pittaway 2 July 2007 - 10:29
 RE: Fiat S76 (merged) John Medley 23 June 2015 - 23:06 
 The Monster The Old Motor 24 March 2011
 Merchandise for fans of the fire breathing monster Fiat S76, “Beast of Turin”
 MSN News 13 january 2021 (in italian)

S76 Record
1910s cars
Racing cars